Carex globularis is a perennial species of sedge in the family Cyperaceae native to damp forests and wetlands of Asia, Eastern Europe, and Scandinavia.

References 

globularis
Flora of Europe
Plants described in 1753
Taxa named by Carl Linnaeus